Loa  are the spirits of Haitian Vodou and Louisiana Voodoo.

Loa may also refer to:

Fictional characters 
 Loa (comics), a character in the Marvel Universe
Loa (Fullmetal Alchemist), a character in the manga series Fullmetal Alchemist

Zoology 
 Loa (nematode), a genus of nematode worms
 Loa loa, a roundworm
 Loa loa filariasis, a disease caused by Loa loa
 Loa, a rarely used term for a butterflyfish taxon at least approximating genus Chaetodon
 Loa, Icelandic name for the European golden plover

Places 
 Loa, Burkina Faso
 Loa, Utah
 Loa River, Chile
 El Loa Province, Chile

Other uses 
 Levels of Autonomy (LoA) 
 Loa, a ship in the Peruvian Navy
 Loa (Spanish play), an introductory theatrical piece

See also 

 LOA (disambiguation)
 Laos, a country in Asia
Lota (name)